Rare, Vol. 2 is the second of two B-side compilation albums by Ultravox. This release chronicles the B-sides of the era 1983-1986, encompassing releases from the albums Lament (Ultravox album) and U-Vox. The album includes almost all B-side releases throughout this period with the exception of the non-album single "Love's Great Adventure", that was previously included in 1984's The Collection.

The album reflects the change in direction for Ultravox c. 1984 as they began to experiment more with remixes and alternate versions of their songs. There are much less original b-side songs on Rare, Vol. 2 than Vol. 1 as most are instrumentals or remixes of a-side tracks.

Like Vol. 1, the tracks are in chronological order of their release except for the final two tracks, which are remixed A-sides that weren't necessarily available in all areas. "Heart Of The Country (Special 12" Remix)" was only released in Germany, while the "Final Mix" of "One Small Day" was on a special 12" remix compilation available with certain editions of The Collection.

Track listing
"Easterly" – 3:51
"Building" – 3:14
"Heart of the Country" (Instrumental) – 4:27
"White China (Live)" – 3:45
"Man of Two Worlds" (Instrumental) – 4:34
"3" – 4:02
"All in One Day" (Instrumental) – 6:15
"Dreams?" – 2:32
"All Fall Down" (Instrumental) – 5:37
"All Fall Down" (Live) – 5:38
"Dream On" (Live) – 3:49
"The Prize" (Live) – 4:58
"Stateless" – 2:54
"Heart of the Country" (Special 12" Remix) – 11:06
"One Small Day" (Final Mix) – 7:36

References

B-side compilation albums
1994 compilation albums
Ultravox compilation albums
Chrysalis Records compilation albums